Who gets the Last Laugh? may refer to:
 Who Gets the Last Laugh?, a 2013 television series on TBS.
 An episode of the television show One Piece.